Şermin is a feminine Turkish given name. It may refer to:

 Şermin Langhoff (born 1969), Turkish-German theater producer and theater director
 Sermin Özürküt (born 1949), Turkish-Swedish politician

Turkish feminine given names